Andreas Lindberg is a Swedish football manager who currently manages the Seton Hall University men's soccer team.

Career

Playing 
Lindberg, originally from Sweden was recruited to play college soccer at LIU Southampton.

Coaching 
Ahead of coaching Seton Hall, Lindberg coach LIU Post, Metropolitan Oval, the NY Hampton Surf and LIU Southampton.

On December 11, 2017, Lindberg was named head coach of Seton Hall.

Managerial record

References

External links 
 Seton Hall Pirates Profile
 Youtube profile

1978 births
Living people
Seton Hall Pirates men's soccer coaches
LIU Post Pioneers men's soccer coaches
Swedish football managers
American soccer coaches
Swedish expatriate sportspeople in the United States
Swedish expatriate footballers
Swedish expatriate football managers
Expatriate soccer managers in the United States
Expatriate soccer players in the United States
College men's soccer players in the United States
American Indoor Soccer League coaches